Phobaeticus is a genus of Asian stick insects comprising over 25 species. 

The generic name of some species used to be Pharnacia (e.g. Phobaeticus serratipes was known as Pharnacia serratipes).

Species
 Phobaeticus annamallayanus (Wood-Mason, 1877)
Phobaeticus chani Bragg, 2008
 Phobaeticus decoris Seow-Choen, 2016
 Phobaeticus foliatus (Bragg, 1995)
Phobaeticus grubaueri (Redtenbacher, 1908)
 Phobaeticus hypharpax (Westwood, 1859)
 Phobaeticus incertus Brunner von Wattenwyl, 1907
 Phobaeticus ingens (Redtenbacher, 1908)
 Phobaeticus kirbyi Brunner von Wattenwyl, 1907
 Phobaeticus lobulatus (Carl, 1913)
 Phobaeticus lumawigi Brock, 1998
 Phobaeticus magnus Hennemann & Conle, 2008
 Phobaeticus mjobergi (Günther, 1935)
Phobaeticus monicachiae Seow-Choen, 2016
 Phobaeticus palawanensis Hennemann & Conle, 2008
 Phobaeticus philippinicus (Hennemann & Conle, 1997)
 Phobaeticus pinnipes (Redtenbacher, 1908)
 Phobaeticus redtenbacheri (Dohrn, 1910)
 Phobaeticus serratipes (Gray, 1835)
 Phobaeticus sinetyi Brunner von Wattenwyl, 1907
 Phobaeticus sobrinus Brunner von Wattenwyl, 1907 (synonym P. beccarianus) - type species
 Phobaeticus trui Bresseel & Constant, 2014

Reassigned species
 P. lambirica, P. rex = Pharnacia rex (Günther, 1928)
 P. sichuanensis = Baculonistria alba Chen & He, 1990

References

External links
 Phasmid Study Group: Phobaeticus
 Phasmida Genus File: Phobaeticus
 

Phasmatodea genera
Taxa named by Carl Brunner von Wattenwyl
Phasmatidae
Phasmatodea of Asia